Erigeron uintahensis is a North American species of flowering plant in the family Asteraceae known by the common name Uinta fleabane. It is native to the western United States, in the states of Idaho, Wyoming, Utah, and Colorado.

Erigeron uintahensis grows alongside sagebrush, pine, aspen, spruce and fir, and also on alpine meadows at high elevation. It is an perennial herb up to 50 centimeters (20 inches) tall, producing rhizomes and a woody underground caudex. The inflorescence is made up of 1-5 flower heads per stem, in a loose array. Each head contains 75–125 blue or lavender ray florets surrounding numerous yellow disc florets.

References

External links
Photo of herbarium specimen at Missouri Botanical Garden, collected in Utah in 1926, isotype of Erigeron uintahensis

uintahensis
Flora of the Western United States
Plants described in 1943
Flora without expected TNC conservation status
Taxa named by Arthur Cronquist